C79 or C-79 may refer to:

 Junkers C-79, the US military designation of the Ju-52 transport aircraft
 Corydoras loxozonus, a freshwater catfish
 C79 optical sight, a small arms telescopic sight
 Ruy Lopez chess openings ECO code
 Secondary malignant neoplasm of other sites ICD-10 code
 Night Work of Young Persons (Non-Industrial Occupations) Convention, 1946 code
 Sun/C79, a 1974 song by Cat Stevens
 Caldwell 79, a globular cluster in the constellation Vela